The procerus muscle (or pyramidalis nasi) is a small pyramidal slip of muscle deep to the superior orbital nerve, artery and vein. Procerus is Latin, meaning tall or extended.

Structure
The procerus muscle arises by tendinous fibers from the fascia covering the lower part of the nasal bone and upper part of the lateral nasal cartilage. It is inserted into the skin over the lower part of the forehead between the two eyebrows on either side of the midline, its fibers merging with those of the frontalis muscle.

Nerve supply 
The procerus muscle is supplied by the temporal branch of the facial nerve (VII). It may also be supplied by other branches of the facial nerve, which can be varied.

Function
The procerus muscle helps to pull that part of the skin between the eyebrows downwards, which assists in flaring the nostrils. It can also contribute to an expression of anger.

Procerus is supplied by temporal and lower zygomatic branches from the facial nerve. A supply from its buccal branch has also been described. Its contraction can produce transverse wrinkles.

Clinical significance

Procerus sign 

Dystonia of the procerus muscle is involved in the procerus sign, which is indicative of progressive supranuclear palsy (PSP).

Denervation 
The procerus muscle may be denervated to reduce furrow lines around the glabella caused by frowning. This may be for cosmetic purposes. Surgery can be used to transect the temporal branch of the facial nerve, although other branches of the facial nerve may also need to be cut.

References

Additional Images

Muscles of the head and neck